Elections for the Eastwood District Council took place on Thursday 3 May 1984, alongside elections to the councils of Scotland's various other districts.

The Conservatives continued their dominance of the council, winning 58% of the vote and all but two of the District's seats.

Aggregate results

References

1984 Scottish local elections
1984
May 1984 events in the United Kingdom